Lara Tamsett (born 12 October 1988) is an Australian long-distance runner.

In 2009, she competed in the senior women's race at the 2009 IAAF World Cross Country Championships held in Amman, Jordan. She finished in 26th place.

In 2012, she competed at the 2012 IAAF World Half Marathon Championships held in Kavarna, Bulgaria. In 2013, she competed in the women's 10,000 metres at the 2013 World Championships in Athletics held in Moscow, Russia. She did not finish her race.

References

External links 
 

Living people
1988 births
Place of birth missing (living people)
Australian female cross country runners
Australian female long-distance runners
World Athletics Championships athletes for Australia
20th-century Australian women
21st-century Australian women